Notolomus is a genus of true weevils in the beetle family Curculionidae. There are at least two described species in Notolomus.

Species
These two species belong to the genus Notolomus:
 Notolomus basalis LeConte, 1876
 Notolomus bicolor LeConte, 1876

References

Further reading

 
 
 

Curculioninae
Articles created by Qbugbot